Georgia Lara (born May 31, 1980) is a female Greek water polo player and Olympic silver medalist with the Greece women's national water polo team.

She received a silver medal at the 2004 Summer Olympics in 2004 Athens.

She received a gold medal with the Greek team at the 2005 FINA Women's Water Polo World League in Kirishi.

She played at the 2006 FINA Women's Water Polo World Cup, where Greece finished 6th, and at the 2006 Women's European Water Polo Championship, where the Greek team also finished 6th.

She participated at the 2008 Women's Water Polo Olympic Qualifier in Imperia, where Greece finished 4th and qualified for the 2008 Olympics in Beijing.

See also
 Greece women's Olympic water polo team records and statistics
 List of Olympic medalists in water polo (women)
 List of world champions in women's water polo
 List of World Aquatics Championships medalists in water polo

References

External links
 

1980 births
Living people
Greek female water polo players
Olympic water polo players of Greece
Water polo players at the 2004 Summer Olympics
Water polo players at the 2008 Summer Olympics
Olympic silver medalists for Greece
Olympic medalists in water polo
Medalists at the 2004 Summer Olympics
World Aquatics Championships medalists in water polo
Water polo players from Athens
21st-century Greek women